The Turka  is a river in Perm Krai, Russia, a left tributary of the Iren, which in turn is a tributary of the Sylva. The main tributaries are the Yug, Savlek, Byrma, Bolshaya Gorevaya, Beryozovka, and Chyornaya Turka.

References 

Rivers of Perm Krai